Neptunia oleracea, commonly known in English as water mimosa or sensitive neptunia, is pantropical nitrogen-fixing perennial legume. Genus and common name come from Neptune, god of the sea, in reference to the aquatic habit of some species in the genus.

Description
Aerenchyma (white spongy air-conducting tissue that gives stems buoyancy) forms on stems floating in water, but does not form on stems growing on land. Plants typically grow to as much as 6" tall, but stems will spread in the water to 3-5' long. Stems are clad with bi-pinnate, fine, mimosa-like sensitive leaves that close up when touched. Primary leaf segments have 8-40 small oblong leaflets arranged in opposite pairs. Tiny greenish-yellow flowers are densely crowded into feathery orbicular inflorescences that bloom in summer. Fruits are flat pods (to 1-2" long). Floating aquatic plant stems often form thick foliage mats and is considered to be an invasive aquatic weed in some tropical waters where large mats may form that choke waterways, resulting in restricted water flow, reduced water quality, reduced fish activity and loss of some underwater and native wetland plants.

Habitat
Primarily found growing prostrate in wet soils near the water's edge or floating on the water in relatively still-water areas. The native habitat of Neptunia oleracea is unknown, but some experts believe it is in the area of Mexico to northern South America.

Uses

Culinary
This plant is cultivated as a vegetable in southeast Asia (leaves and shoots have cabbage-like flavor). Young ends of stems and pods are edible and usually eaten raw as a vegetable in Vietnam, Thailand, Laos and Cambodia and cultivated much like rice. The young leaves, shoot tips and young pods are usually eaten raw or in stir-fries and curries such as kaeng som.

Medicinal
Juice of the stem and roots are used for medicinal purposes. Whole plant extract exhibited cytotoxic activity on neoplastic cell lines. Extract of the herb exhibited hepatoprotective activity.

Common names
 Khmer: Kanchait
 Meiteilon/Manipuri: Eshing ekai thabi
 Thai: Phak runon or phak krachet, pronounced "phak kachēt".
 Vietnamese: Rau nhút
 Sinhalese: 
 Tamil language: Cuṇṭi or nīrc-cuṇṭi, referring to its sensitivity to touch (cuṇṭu: to tap with thumb or finger)
 Mon: Khamək (ခမက်)

References

External links

The Vegetable Sector in Thailand

Asian vegetables
oleracea
Edible legumes
Pantropical flora